Melita Fabečić (born c. December 1994) is a Croatian beauty pageant titleholder who was crowned Miss Universe Croatia 2013. She represented her country in the 2013 Miss Universe, where she failed to place in the semi-final.

Miss Universe Hrvatske 2013
Melita Fabečić, from Zagreb, was crowned Miss Universe Hrvatske 2013 among 20 contestants during the annual beauty competition which took place on May 10. Her measurements are 32-23-36.

References

External links
Official Miss Universe Hrvatske website

Croatian beauty pageant winners
Living people
1995 births
Miss Universe 2013 contestants